Public art in Bend, Oregon, in the United States, has been facilitated in part by Art in Public Places (AiPP), since 1973.

List of artworks

 Art (also known as The Traveler) by Richard Beyer, installed 1982, Corner of Wall Street and Franklin Avenue
 Atilt, Sundra and Garden Gate by Mel Katz, installed 2002, Newport Avenue and 14th Street Roundabout
 Bend Gate by Lee Kelly, installed 1998, Bend Parkway
 Big Ears by Joe Halko, installed 2001, Century Drive and Simpson Avenue Roundabout
 Brandis Square by Huston Barber and Barrett Turner, installed 1986, Wall Street and Greenwood Avenue
 Bueno Homage to the Buckaroo by Danae Miller, installed 2005, Butler Market Road and 8th Street Roundabout
 Butte Creek Pass by Douglas Campbell Smith, installed 1977, Central Oregon Community College
 Cascade Landscape by Bruce West, installed 1991, Drake Park
 Centennial Logger by Jerry Werner, installed 2004, Reed Market Road and Farewell Bend Park Roundabout
 Centennial Planter by Jerry Werner, installed 2004, Reed Market Road and Alderwood Circle Roundabout
 Central Oregon Landscape by Mirra Meyer, installed 1977, Deschutes County Library
 Concrete Planters by Marge Hammond, installed 1978, Colorado Bridge
 Dancing Circle by Margaret Puckette, installed 1995, Rosie Bareis Community Campus
 Dark Ombre by Tom Currie, installed 1979, Deschutes County Commissioners Office
 Dreamweaver by Eric Holt, installed 2014, Healing Garden at St. Charles Cancer Center
 Earth Song by Bruce West, installed 2005, NorthWest Crossing Drive and Shevlin Park Road Roundabout
 Evening Sounds by Ruth Rodman, installed 1977, Central Oregon Community College Grandview Student Center
 Evolution by Troy Pillow, installed 2008, Bear Creek Road and 8th Street Roundabout
 Fabric Banners by Anita Curl, installed 1996, Mt. View High School
 Flowing by Al Goldsby, installed 1989, Bend Park and Recreation Administration Building
 Flowing by Maya Radoczy, installed 1998, Deschutes Public Library
 Grizzly by Sherry Sander, installed 2001, 9th Street and Franklin Avenue Roundabout
 High Desert Spiral by John Fleming, installed 2013, Mt. Washington Drive and Simpson Roundabout
 Kickoff by Gloria Bornstein, installed 2012, Pine Nursery Park Roundabout
 Landscape Elements by Betty Feves, installed 1983, Pinckney Center at Central Oregon Community College
 Lodestar by Roger Berry, installed 2009, Bond Street and Reed Market Roundabout
 Mentant Passage by Walter Crump, installed 1977, Central Oregon Community College Grandview Student Center
 Might of the Work Force by Devin Field, installed 2005, Butler Market Road and 8th Street Roundabout
 Migration by Hai Ying Wu, installed 2004, Corner of College Way and Newport Avenue
 Milky Way by Devin Laurence Field, installed 2013, Mt. Washington Drive and Shevlin Park Road Roundabout
 Mt. Bachelor Compass by Steve Jensen, installed 2002, Century Drive and Mt. Washington Drive Roundabout
 Orb I by Brandon Zebold, installed 2005, Mt. Washington Drive and Skyliners Road Roundabout
 Otter by Ann Bannard, installed 1980, Riverbend Park
 Otter Knot by Wayne Chabre, installed 2001, Deschutes Public Library
 Phoenix Rising by Frank Boyden, installed 2002, Century Drive and Galveston Road Roundabout
 Pronghorns by Tom Hardy, installed 1981, High Desert Museum
 Redsides by Miles Pepper, installed 2001, Colorado and Simpson Avenue Roundabout
 Riparian Botanicals by Troy Corless, installed 2011, East Bend Library
 River Geese by Peter Helze, installed 2000, McKay Park
 Salmon Dance by Wayne Chabre, installed 2001, Deschutes Public Library
 Smith Rocks by Al Goldsby, installed 1978, Lava Lands Visitor Center
 Sound Garden by Lee Kelly, installed 2010, Reed Market and Mount Bachelor Drive Roundabout
 Spirit Singers by William Van Buskirk, installed 1996, Ronald McDonald House
 Sunrise Spirit Column by David Govedare, installed 2001, NorthWest Crossing Drive and Mt. Washington Drive Roundabout
 Untitled by Tom Hardy, U.S. National Bank of Oregon, Bend Branch
 Untitled by Mara Smith and Kris King, installed 1990, Bend City Hall
 The Viking by Melvin Schuler, installed 1979, Deschutes County Courthouse
 Watercolor Prints by Mike Smith, installed 1999, Kemple Children's Clinic
 Yakaya by Troy Pillow, installed 2010, Riverbend Community Park Roundabout

References

Culture of Bend, Oregon
Bend
Bend, Oregon